Robert Jardine McCleave (19 December 1922 – 3 September 2004) was a Progressive Conservative party
member of the House of Commons of Canada. He was born in Moncton, New Brunswick, and became a journalist, judge and lawyer by career. He was also an editor of the Halifax Chronicle-Herald and became a news director at radio station CJCH. McCleave attended Dalhousie University, where he graduated in law studies.

He was first elected at the Halifax riding in the 1957 general election. Except for a defeat at that riding in the 1963 federal election, he was re-elected to Parliament until the 1974 federal election.

The Halifax riding was shared by two Members of Parliament until 1967. McCleave was joined by fellow Progressive Conservative member Edmund L. Morris from 1957 to 1963, then by Michael Forrestall, another Progressive Conservative, from 1965 to 1968. The Halifax riding was redefined in 1967 so that it elected only a single Member of Parliament, therefore McCleave campaigned in the Halifax—East Hants riding as of the 1968 federal election.

He left federal office after 8 December 1977, prior to the end of his term in the 30th Canadian Parliament and became a provincial court judge for the province of Nova Scotia, where he served for ten years.

Electoral record

References

External links
 

1922 births
2004 deaths
20th-century Canadian judges
Judges in Nova Scotia
Dalhousie University alumni
Members of the House of Commons of Canada from Nova Scotia
People from Moncton
Progressive Conservative Party of Canada MPs
20th-century Canadian journalists